EP300 interacting inhibitor of differentiation 2, also known as EID2 is a human gene.

Function
The protein encoded by this gene may function as an endogenous suppressor of TGF-beta signaling and  inhibits differentiation by blocking the histone acetyltransferase activity of p300, class I histone deacetylase, HDACs. The N-terminal portion of EID-2 was required for the binding to HDACs. This region was also involved in the transcriptional repression and nuclear localization, suggesting the importance of the involvement of HDACs in the EID-2 function. EID-2 inhibits TGF-beta/Smad transcriptional responses. EID-2 interacts constitutively with Smad proteins, and most strongly with Smad3. Stable expression of EID-2 in the TGF-beta1-responsive cell line inhibits endogenous Smad3-Smad4 complex formation and TGF-beta1-induced expression of p21 and p15.
EID-2 displays developmentally regulated expression with high levels in adult heart and brain. Overexpression of EID-2 inhibits muscle-specific gene expression through inhibition of MyoD-dependent transcription. This inhibitory effect on gene expression can be explained by EID-2's ability to associate with and inhibit the acetyltransferase activity of p300.

References